Alina Oleksandrivna Iagupova (Ukrainian: Аліна Олександрівна Ягупова; born February 9, 1992) is a Ukrainian basketball player for Fenerbahçe and the Ukrainian national team for which she has been team captain.

She participated at the EuroBasket Women 2017.

Honors
 Turkish Super League champion (2021, 2022)
 Turkish Women's Basketball Presidential Cup champion (2019)
 Turkish Women's Basketball Cup champion (2020)

References

1992 births
Living people
Shooting guards
Sportspeople from Dnipro
Ukrainian expatriate basketball people in Turkey
Ukrainian women's basketball players
Fenerbahçe women's basketball players